Samuel Elias Sawbridge (7 January 1769 – 27 May 1850) was an English politician who sat in the House of Commons of Great Britain and then of the United Kingdom from 1796 to 1797 and again in 1807.

He was the second son of John Sawbridge of Olantigh, Kent and his wife Anne Stephenson, daughter of Sir William Stephenson. His father was Lord Mayor of London in 1775 and MP for both Hythe and the City of London. Sawbridge was educated at both Harrow School and Eton College. He joined the East Kent Militia as an ensign and rose to the rank of Colonel by 1808.

On the early death of his elder brother he inherited his father's fortune and in 1796 acquired a seat in Parliament to represent Canterbury. However the election was declared void on 2 March 1797. Re-elected on 10 March 1797 he was again unseated on petition on 12 May 1797. He was finally properly elected for Canterbury in February 1807, sitting only until May 1807, after which he left Parliament for the life of a country gentleman and Militia colonel.

He died in May 1850, aged 81. He had married Elizabeth, the daughter of Bombay Governor Brabazon Ellis of Wyddiall Hall, Hertfordshire, with whom he had 5 sons and 3 daughters. Their son John was Member of Parliament for Wareham for many years.

References

External links

1850 deaths
1769 births
People educated at Harrow School
People educated at Eton College
Members of the Parliament of Great Britain for English constituencies
British MPs 1796–1800
Members of the Parliament of the United Kingdom for English constituencies
UK MPs 1807–1812
Kent Militia officers